Rio Bonito is a municipality located in the Brazilian state of Rio de Janeiro. Its population was 60,573 (2020) and its area is 462 km².

The municipality contains part of the Central Rio de Janeiro Atlantic Forest Mosaic of conservation units, created in 2006.

References

Site 
GuiaRB - The Rio Bonito Site

Municipalities in Rio de Janeiro (state)